Stuttgart is a city in Germany, capital of the state Baden-Württemberg.

Stuttgart may also refer to:

Places
Stuttgart (region), an administration district (Regierungsbezirk) in Germany
Stuttgart Region, a region around Stuttgart
Stuttgart, Arkansas, United States
Stuttgart, Kansas, United States

Other uses
Stuttgart (soil), a type of soil in the United States
VfB Stuttgart football club
Stuttgart Observatory, astronomical observatory
SMS Stuttgart, German Königsberg-class light cruiser